Matthias Flach is a German mathematician, professor and former executive officer for mathematics (department chair) at California Institute of Technology.

Professional overview
Research interests includes:
Arithmetic algebraic geometry (see Glossary of arithmetic and Diophantine geometry).
Special values of L-functions.
Conjectures of:
Bloch
Beilinson
Deligne
Bloch–Kato conjecture (see also List of conjectures).
Galois module theory.
Motivic cohomology.

Education overview
Ph.D. University of Cambridge UK 1991 Dissertation: Selmer groups for the Symmetric Square of an Elliptic Curve – Algebraic geometry 
Diplom, Goethe University Frankfurt, Germany, 1986

Publications
Iwasawa Theory and Motivic L-functions (2009) – Flach, Matthias
On Galois structure invariants associated to Tate motives – Matthias Flach and D. Burns, King's College London
On the Equivariant Tamagawa Number Conjecture for Tate Motives, Part II. (2006) – Burns, David; Flach, Matthias.
Euler characteristics in relative K-groups – Matthias Flach
The equivariant Tamagawa number conjecture: A survey (with an appendix by C. Greither) – Matthias Flach
A geometric example of non-abelian Iwasawa theory, June 2004, Canadian Number Theory Association VIII Meeting – Flach, Matthias.
The Tamagawa number conjecture of adjoint motives of modular forms (2004) – Diamond, Fred; Flach, Matthias; Guo, Li.
Adjoint motives of modular forms and the Tamagawa number conjecture (2001) – Fred Diamond; Matthias Flach; Li Guo.

Notes

References
ScientificCommons Publication List
Seminar on Fermat's last theorem By Vijaya Kumar Murty, Fields Institute for Research in Mathematical Sciences
The Fermat diary By Charles J. Mozzochi

External links
Flach's Homepage at Caltech

Living people
1963 births